Fabio Pinca (born June 14, 1984) is an Italian-French Muay Thai kickboxer and mixed martial artist. Pinca is currently signed to ONE Championship. In 2010, Pinca became the first winner of the annual Thai Fight tournament.

Biography 
Fabio Pinca was born on 14 June 1984. Pinca resides in Lyon, France and trains at Gym boxing St Fons in Saint-Fons, Lyon. His trainer is Nasser Kacem.

Fabio began training in Muaythai at the age of 15. He discovered Muaythai while watching a video tape from Thailand. Boxers who inspired Pinca were Ramon Dekkers, Dany Bill, Saimai and Farid Villaume. By learning about a club near his home, he found the Boxing Gym St-Fons who already had good boxers.

He enjoyed his first training in Muaythai and was very motivated to continue. After his first fight, much work and improvement lay ahead. From that moment on, he devoted himself to the sport. He has never changed clubs since the start of his Muaythai career because he thinks that there are quite a few good Thai boxers in Saint-Fons and a very good coach that prepares fighters for battle.

Fabio Pinca has a job as an educational facilitator in his city with a flexible schedule which allows him to focus on his athletic career.

In March 2014, Fabio Pinca became an event organiser and created his own promotion called STRIKE FIGHT. The first event will held in his native city Lyon in France on June 27, 2014.

Career 
Fabio Pinca fought in Muaythai and kickboxing, but his preference is for Muaythai because he is passionate about the sport and Thai culture. He likes to use his elbows and knees.

In 2004 he was French Muay Thai Champion Class B and wins World Muaythai Championships bronze medal. In 2005 he reached the finals of French Muay Thai Championship Class A. In 2006 he became WPKC European Kickboxing Champion. In 2008 he won the Fighting Day 8 Thai Boxing 4 Men tournament in Italy and he became WBC Intercontinental Muay Thai Lightweight Champion. In 2009 he became WBC World Muay Thai Champion and in 2010 he won the Isuzu Thai Fight -67 kg Tournament, defeating Youssef Boughanem in the tournament final.

Pinca has experience that belies his young age having fought Attachai, Bovy, Sudsakorn Sor Klinmee and the legendary Saenchai Sor Kingstar.

He faced Saiyok Pumpanmuang at Thai Fight: Lyon on September 19, 2012 in Lyon, France and lost via decision after three rounds.

Pinca fought Dutch-Turkish kickboxer Tayfun Ozcan at Time Fight 2 in Tours, France, on October 6, 2012. He battered his opponent with knee strikes from the Thai clinch and forced a stop to the bout in round three after breaking Ozcan's arm.

He faced Alessandro Campagna in a tournament reserve bout at Glory 3: Rome - 2012 Middleweight Slam Final 8 on November 3, 2012 in Rome, Italy, and lost via unanimous decision. He was docked a point in the third round for excessive clinching which is banned under kickboxing rules.

He bested Yakdam on points at La Nuit des Titans in Tours, France, on February 2, 2013.

A rematch between Fabio Pinca and Sitthichai Sitsongpeenong went down at Best of Siam 3 in Paris, France, on February 14, 2013 but he was unable to take his revenge as he lost a unanimous decision.

He fought Saenchai for the second time on 21 January 2012 at 'Yokkao Extreme' and won a controversial decision. Pinca struggled early on against Saenchai despite having a 12 kg weight advantage and took out his frustration with a headbutt on his opponent that went unpunished.

Pinca competed in the four man tournament at MAX Muay Thai 2 in Pattaya, Thailand on June 29, 2013. He caused an upset by outpointing Diesellek Aoodonmuang in the semi-finals but was then on the receiving end of one when he lost a decision to Victor Nagbe in the final.

He beat Malaipet Sasiprapa by unanimous decision for the inaugural Lion Fight Welterweight Championship at Lion Fight 12 in Las Vegas on November 1, 2013.

He was set to fight Buakaw Banchamek for the vacant WMC World Junior Middleweight (-69.9 kg/154 lb) Championship Monte Carlo Fighting Masters 2014 in Monte Carlo, Monaco on June 14, 2014 but withdrew after being injured in his bout with Thongchai Sitsongpeenong and was replaced by Djime Coulibaly.

Pinca challenged Rajadamnern Stadium 67 kg champion Manaowan Sitsongpeenong for his title on February 23, 2017 on the Best of Siam show taking place at the legendary Thai stadium. He won to take the biggest accolade of his Muay Thai career.

Pinca made his ONE Championship debut at ONE Championship: Heroes of Honor on April 20, 2018. He faced Nong-O Gaiyanghadao under ONE Super Series Muay Thai rules, losing by unanimous decision.

Mixed martial arts
Fabio Pinca was originally scheduled to make his mixed martial arts debut against fellow Muay Thai fighter Sagetdao Petpayathai at ONE Championship: Kingdom of Heroes on October 6, 2018. However, their fight was later pulled from the card.

He finally made his MMA debut at ONE Championship: No Surrender 3 on August 21, 2020. He lost to Shannon Wiratchai by split decision.

Titles and achievements

Professional
 Rajadamnern Stadium 
 2017 Rajadamnern Stadium Champion -67Kg
 International Sport Karate Association 
 2016 ISKA World Welterweight Muay Thai Champion
 Kombat League 
 2015  Kombat League World Champion MT -67 kg
 Lion Fight 
 2013 Lion Fight Welterweight Championship
 MAX Muay Thai 
 2013 MAX Muay Thai 2 Tournament Runner-up
 WBC Muaythai 
 2012 WBC World Muaythai Welterweight Champion (147 lbs/66.678 kg)
 2009 WBC World Muaythai Super Lightweight Champion (140 lbs/63.503 kg)
 2008 W.B.C. Intercontinental Muay Thai Lightweight Champion
 THAI FIGHT 
 2011 THAI FIGHT Tournament Runner Up (-67 kg)
 2010 THAI FIGHT Tournament Champion (-67 kg)
 Nuit des Champions 
 2008 Nuit des Champions Muaythai belt
 Fighting Day 8 
 2008 Fighting Day 8 Thai Boxing 4 Men Tournament Champion (-64.500 kg)
 World Professional Kickboxing Council 
 2006 WPKC European Kickboxing Champion
 Fédération française de kick boxing 
 2005 French Muay Thai Vice Champion Class A (-63.500 kg)

Amateur
 2004 World Muay Thai Championships, Bangkok Thailand  (-63.500 kg)
 2004 French Muay Thai Champion Class B (-60 kg)
 2002 Junior French Muay Thai Champion
Awards:
 2010 Muaythaitv Best Nakmuay of the Year

Mixed martial arts record

|-
|Loss
|align=center|0–1
|Shannon Wiratchai 
|Decision (split) 
|ONE Championship: No Surrender 3
|
|align=center|3
|align=center|5:00 
|Bangkok, Thailand 
|-

Muay Thai record 

|-
|-  style="background:#cfc;"
| 2018-05-05|| Win||align=left| Petsanguan || WARRIORS NIGHT 5 || France || KO (Left High Kick)  || 2 || 1:40
|-
|- style="background:#fbb;"
|2018-04-20 || Loss ||align=left| Nong-O Gaiyanghadao || ONE Championship: Heroes of Honor ||Philippines || Decision (Unanimous) || 3 || 3:00
|-
|- style="background:#fbb;"
| 2017-10-28 || Loss ||align=left| Anvar Boynazarov || Glory 47: Lyon|| Lyon, France || KO (Left Hook)  || 2 || 1:52
|-
|-  style="background:#cfc;"
| 2017-07-01 || Win ||align=left| Rungrat Pumpanmuang ||Chook Muay|| France || KO (Left Hook)|| 3 ||
|-  style="background:#cfc;"
| 2017-02-23 || Win ||align=left| Manaowan Sitsongpeenong || Best of Siam & Rajadamnern Stadium || Bangkok, Thailand || Decision || 5 || 3:00
|-
! style=background:white colspan=9 |
|-  style="background:#cfc;"
| 2016-12-10 || Win ||align=left| Mosab Amrani || Glory 36: Oberhausen || Oberhausen, Germany || Decision (split) || 3 || 3:00
|-
|-  style="background:#cfc;"
| 2016-10-08||  Win  ||align=left| Liam Harrison || Yokkao 19 || Bolton, England || Decision (Unanimous) || 5  || 3:00 
|-
|-  style="background:#cfc;"
| 2016-09-17|| Win ||align=left|  Andrei Kulebin || Wicked One Duel || Paris, France || Decision (unanimous) || 5 || 3:00
|-
|-  style="background:#cfc;"
| 2016-07-02 || Win ||align=left|  Yang Zhuo || Glory of Heroes 3|| Jiyuan, China || Decision (split) || 3 || 3:00
|-  style="background:#CCFFCC"
| 2016-05-14 || Win ||align=left| Reece McAllister  || The Tanko Main Event || Bolton，United Kingdom || Decision  || 5 || 3:00
|-
! style=background:white colspan=9 |
|-
|-  style="background:#fbb;"
| 2016-04-02 || Loss ||align=left| Tie Yinghua || Glory of Heroes 2 || Shenzhen, China || Decision (split) || 3 || 3:00
|-  style="background:#CCFFCC"
| 2016-03-13 || Win ||align=left| Azize Hlali  || La Nuit des Titans || Tours, France || Decision (split) || 5 || 3:00
|-  style="background:#CCFFCC"
| 2016-01-30 || Win ||align=left| Charlie Peters || Lion Fight 27|| United States|| Decision || 5 || 3:00
|-
! style="background:white" colspan=8 |
|-  style="background:#CCFFCC"
| 2015-11-21 || Win ||align=left| Bobo Sacko || Warriors Night 4 || Paris, France || Decision || 5 || 3:00
|-  style="background:#CCFFCC"
| 2015-11-07 || Win ||align=left| Edye Ruiz || Top Fight Madrid|| Spain|| Decision || 3 || 3:00
|-  style="background:#CCFFCC"
| 2015-05-02 || Win ||align=left| Mauro Serra || Kunlun Fight 24|| Verona, Italy|| KO || 2 || 3:00
|-
! style="background:white" colspan=8 |
|- style="background:#FFBBBB"
| 2014-02-08 || Loss ||align=left| Thongchai Sitsongpeenong || La Nuit Des Titans || Tours, France || Decision || 5 || 3:00
|-
|-  style="background:#CCFFCC"
| 2013-11-01 || Win ||align=left| Malaipet Sasiprapa || Lion Fight 12 || Las Vegas, Nevada || Decision (unanimous) || 5 || 3:00
|-
! style="background:white" colspan=8 |
|-
|-  style="background:#CCFFCC"
| 2013-10-11 || Win ||align=left| Mehdi Zatout || WARRIORS NIGHT 2 || France || Decision || 5 || 3:00
|-
|-  style="background:#FFBBBB"
| 2013-06-29 || Loss ||align=left| Victor Nagbe || MAX Muay Thai 2, Final || Pattaya, Thailand || Decision || 3 || 3:00
|-
! style="background:white" colspan=8 |
|-
|-  style="background:#CCFFCC"
| 2013-06-29 || Win ||align=left| Diesellek Aoodonmuang || MAX Muay Thai 2, Semi Finals || Pattaya, Thailand || Decision || 3 || 3:00
|-
|-  style="background:#CCFFCC"
| 2013-05-11 || Win ||align=left| Mickael Françoise || THE GAME || Saint-Denis, La Réunion || Decision  || 5 || 3:00
|-
|-  style="background:#FFBBBB"
| 2013-02-14 || Loss ||align=left| Sitthichai Sitsongpeenong || Best of Siam 3 || Paris, France || Decision (unanimous) || 5 || 3:00
|-
|-  style="background:#CCFFCC"
| 2013-02-02 || Win ||align=left| Yakdam || La Nuit des Titans || Tours, France || Decision  || 5 || 3:00
|-
|-  style="background:#FFBBBB"
| 2012-11-02 || Loss ||align=left| Alessandro Campagna || Glory 3: Rome - 70 kg Slam Tournament, Reserve Bout || Rome, Italy || Decision (unanimous) || 3 || 3:00
|-
|-  style="background:#CCFFCC"
| 2012-10-06 || Win ||align=left| Tayfun Ozcan || Time Fight 2 || Tours, France || TKO (broken arm) || 3 ||
|-
|-  style="background:#FFBBBB"
| 2012-09-19 || Loss ||align=left| Saiyok Pumpanmuang || THAI FIGHT Lyon || Lyon, France || Decision || 3 || 3:00
|-
|-  style="background:#CCFFCC"
| 2012-06-09 || Win ||align=left| Big Ben Chor Praram 6 || WBC Battle of the belts || Bangkok, Thailand || Decision || 5 || 3:00
|-
! style="background:white" colspan=8 | 
|-
|-  style="background:#FFBBBB"
| 2012-05-26 || Loss || align=left|  Giorgio Petrosyan || Glory 1: Stockholm - 70 kg Slam Tournament, First Round || Stockholm, Sweden || Decision (Unanimous) || 3 || 3:00
|-
|-  style="background:#FFBBBB"
| 2012-03-17 || Loss ||align=left| Eakpracha Meenayothin || La Nuit des Titans || Tours, France  || Decision || 5 || 3:00
|-
|-  style="background:#CCFFCC"
| 2012-01-21 || Win ||align=left| Saenchai Sinbimuaythai || Yokkao Extreme 2012 || Milan, Italy  || Decision || 3 || 3:00
|-
|-  style="background:#FFBBBB"
| 2011-12-18 || Loss ||align=left| Kem Sitsongpeenong || THAI FIGHT 2011 – 67 kg Tournament, Final || Bangkok, Thailand || Decision || 3 || 3:00
|-
! style="background:white" colspan=8 | 
|-
|-  style="background:#CCFFCC"
| 2011-11-27 || Win ||align=left| Mosab Amrani || THAI FIGHT 2011 67 kg Tournament, Semi Final || Bangkok, Thailand || Decision || 3 || 3:00
|-
|-  style="background:#CCFFCC"
| 2011-09-25 || Win ||align=left| Yokoyama Shigeyuki || THAI FIGHT 2011 67 kg Tournament, Quarter Final || Bangkok, Thailand || Decision || 3 || 3:00
|-
|-  style="background:#CCFFCC"
| 2011-08-07 || Win ||align=left| Yuya Yamato || THAI FIGHT EXTREME 2011: Japan || Ariake Coliseum, Japan || Decision || 3 || 3:00
|-
|-  style="background:#CCFFCC"
| 2011-07-17 || Win ||align=left| Ding Ning || THAI FIGHT EXTREME 2011: Hong Kong || Hong Kong, China || TKO || 2 ||
|-
|-  style="background:#FFBBBB"
| 2011-05-14 || Loss ||align=left| Yuya Yamato || THAI FIGHT EXTREME 2011: France || Cannes, France || TKO (Elbow/Cut) || 2 ||
|-
|-  style="background:#CCFFCC"
| 2010-12-06 || Win ||align=left| Youssef Boughanem || THAI FIGHT Final, Final || Korat, Thailand || Decision || 3 || 3:00
|-
! style="background:white" colspan=8 | 
|-
|-  style="background:#CCFFCC"
| 2010-12-06 || Win ||align=left| Petchmankong Petchfocus || THAI FIGHT Final 4, Semi Finals || Korat, Thailand || Decision || 3 || 3:00
|-
|-  style="background:#CCFFCC"
| 2010-10-25 || Win ||align=left| Rafi Zouheir || THAI FIGHT Final 8 || Bangkok, Thailand || Decision || 3 || 3:00
|-
|-  style="background:#CCFFCC"
| 2010-08-29 || Win ||align=left| Sharos Huyer || THAI FIGHT Final 16 || Bangkok, Thailand || KO || 1 ||
|-
|-  style="background:#CCFFCC"
| 2010-06-05 || Win ||align=left| Singmanee Sor Srisompong || La Nuit des Challenges 8 || Lyon, Saint-Fons, France || Decision (Unanimous) || 5 || 3:00
|-
|-  style="background:#FFBBBB"
| 2010-01-30 || Loss ||align=left| Sitthichai Sitsongpeenong || La Nuit des Titans, Semi Final || Tours, France || Decision || 4 || 3:00
|-
|-  style="background:#CCFFCC"
| 2009-11-28 || Win ||align=left| Danthai Siangmanasak || A1 Lyon || Lyon, France || TKO || 3 ||
|-
! style="background:white" colspan=8 | 
|-
|-  style="background:#FFBBBB"
| 2009-11-14 || Loss ||align=left| Kem Sitsongpeenong || La Nuit des Champions 2009 || Marseilles, France || Decision || 5 || 3:00
|-
! style="background:white" colspan=8 | 
|-
|-  style="background:#c5d2ea"
| 2009-08-30 || Draw ||align=left| Danthai Siangmanasak || TV 7 || Bangkok, Thailand || Decision || 5 || 3:00
|-
|-  style="background:#CCFFCC"
| 2009-06-20 || Win ||align=left| Nuetorani || Gala de Boxe Thai : Le Grand Défi || Levallois-Perret, France || KO (Elbow) || 3 ||
|-
|-  style="background:#CCFFCC"
| 2009-05-16 || Win ||align=left| Sabri Sahali || Légendes et Guerriers || Toulouse, France || TKO || 2 ||
|-
|-  style="background:#CCFFCC"
| 2009-03-26 || Win ||align=left| Bovy Sor Udomson || Les Stars du Ring || Levallois-Perret, France || Decision || 5 || 3:00
|-
|-  style="background:#CCFFCC"
| 2008-11-29 || Win ||align=left| Sudsakorn Sor Klinmee || La nuit des Champions 2008 || Marseilles, France || TKO || 5 ||
|-
! style="background:white" colspan=8 | 
|-
|-  style="background:#CCFFCC"
| 2008-11-08 || Win ||align=left| Kenta || Janus Fight Night "The Legend" || Padova, Italy || Decision (uanimous) || 5 || 3:00
|-
|-  style="background:#CCFFCC"
| 2008-11-06 || Win ||align=left| Hassan Ait Bassou || Muay Thaï à Levallois || Levallois-Perret, France || Decision || 5 || 3:00
|-
|-  style="background:#CCFFCC"
| 2008-07-19 || Win ||align=left| Kaensak Sor.Ploenjit || WCK: Full Rules Muay Thai, Pechanga Resort Casino || Temecula, CA || Decision (Unanimous) || 5 || 3:00
|-  style="background:#FFBBBB"
| 2008-06-12 || Loss ||align=left| Attachai Fairtex || Gala de Levallois || Levallois-Perret, France || Decision || 5 || 3:00
|-
|-  style="background:#CCFFCC"
| 2008-06-07 || Win ||align=left| Lempard Sor Khamsing || La Nuit des Challenges 5 || Lyon, Saint-Fons, France || Decision (Split) || 5 || 3:00
|-
|-  style="background:#CCFFCC"
| 2008-03-02 || Win ||align=left| Riccardo Cumani || Fighting Day 8, Final || Imola, Italy || Decision || 3 || 3:00
|-
! style="background:white" colspan=8 | 
|-
|-  style="background:#CCFFCC"
| 2008-03-02 || Win ||align=left| Gionata Zarbo || Fighting Day 8, Semi Final || Imola, Italy || TKO (Doctor Stoppage) || 2 ||
|-
|-  style="background:#FFBBBB"
| 2008-01-26 || Loss ||align=left| Danthai Siangmanasak || La Nuit des Titans 3 || Tours, France || Decision || 5 || 3:00
|-
|-  style="background:#CCFFCC"
| 2007-11-17 || Win ||align=left| Loris Audoui || La Nuit des Champions 2007 || Marseilles, France || TKO (Referee Stoppage) || 2 ||
|-
|-  style="background:#FFBBBB"
| 2007-10-27 || Loss ||align=left| Attachai Fairtex || One Night in Bangkok || Antwerp, Belgium || Decision || 5 || 3:00
|-
|-  style="background:#FFBBBB"
| 2007-09-24 || Loss ||align=left| Alexander Himoroda || Kings of Muaythai : Belarus vs Europe || Minsk, Belarus || TKO (Doctor Stoppage) || 3 ||
|-
|-  style="background:#CCFFCC"
| 2007-09-08 || Win ||align=left| Kaensak Soh || WBC Muay Thai Presents: World Championship Muay Thai || Gardena, CA || Decision (Split) || 5 || 3:00
|-
! style="background:white" colspan=8 | 
|-
|-  style="background:#FFBBBB"
| 2007-06-16 || Loss ||align=left| Karim Saada || La Nuit des Super Fights VIII || Paris, France || Decision (Unanimous) || 5 || 3:00
|-
|-  style="background:#CCFFCC"
| 2007-05-26 || Win ||align=left| Robert Van Nimwegen || Thai Boxe Mondiale : Abano Grand Prix || Italy || Decision || 5 || 3:00
|-
|-  style="background:#FFBBBB"
| 2007-04-21 || Loss ||align=left| Saenchai Sor Kingstar || Gala de Levallois-Perret || Levallois-Perret, France || Decision (Unanimous) || 5 || 3:00
|-
|-  style="background:#FFBBBB"
| 2007-04-06 || Loss ||align=left| Sak Kaoponlek || Muay Thai: Kaoponlek VS Liam HARRISON || Italy || Decision || 5 || 3:00
|-
! style="background:white" colspan=8 | 
|-
|-  style="text-align:center; background:#CCFFCC"
| 2006-12-09 || Win ||align=left| Sila Nakornparkview || Muay Thai in Action || Uster, Switzerland || Decision || 5 || 3:00
|-
|-  style="background:#CCFFCC"
| 2006-12-04 || Win ||align=left| Pichitchai Sorprapa || King's Anniversary || Bangkok, Thailand || Decision || 5 || 3:00
|-
|-  style="background:#CCFFCC"
| 2006-11-18 || Win ||align=left| Saksri || France vs Thaïlande || France || KO || 2 ||
|-
|-  style="background:#CCFFCC"
| 2006-07-21 || Win ||align=left| Mohamed Essadiri || Fight Night IV || Pomezia, Italy || Decision || 7 || 2:00
|-
! style="background:white" colspan=8 | 
|-
|-  style="background:#CCFFCC"
| 2006-05-13 || Win ||align=left| Chonleak Kaewsamrit || Le Thaï Tournament II : France vs Thaïlande || Thônex, Switzerland || Decision || 5 || 3:00
|-
|-  style="background:#CCFFCC"
| 2006-03-02 || Win ||align=left| Honthong || Kickboxing : France vs Thaïlande || Levallois-Perret, France || Decision || 5 || 2:00
|-
|-  style="background:#CCFFCC"
| 2006-01-14 || Win ||align=left| Totoff || La nuit des Superfights III || Villebon, France || Decision || 5 || 3:00
|-
|-  style="background:#CCFFCC"
| 2006-00-00 || Win ||align=left| Raouf Beliouz || Gala à Tours || Tours, France || Decision || 5 ||
|-
|-  style="background:#CCFFCC"
| 2005-12-17 || Win ||align=left| Antonio Raya || Gala de Badalona || Badalona, Spain || TKO (Referee Stoppage) || 4 ||
|-
|-  style="background:#CCFFCC"
| 2005-10-22 || Win ||align=left| Totoff || La nuit des Superfights II || Villebon, France || Decision || 5 || 3:00
|-
|-  style="background:#CCFFCC"
| 2005-06-10 || Win ||align=left| Mattew Jonstone || Muay Thai a Fiume Veneto || Fiume Veneto, Italy || KO || 4 ||
|-
|-  style="background:#FFBBBB"
| 2005-05-14 || Loss ||align=left| Olivier Tchétché || French Championship 2005 Class A, Final || Paris, France || Decision (Unanimous) || 5 ||
|-
! style="background:white" colspan=8 | 
|-
|-  style="background:#CCFFCC"
| 2005-04-30 || Win ||align=left| Gary Hamilton || Post Tenebra Cup 2005 || Geneva, Switzerland || TKO || 2 ||
|-
|-  style="background:#CCFFCC"
| 2005-03-26 || Win ||align=left| Mamadou Diabira || French Championship 2005 Class A, Semi Final || Paris, France || Decision || 5 ||
|-
|-  style="background:#CCFFCC"
| 2005-01-15 || Win ||align=left| Stéphane Vincent || French Championship 2005 Class A, Quarter Final || Paris, France || KO || 2 ||
|-
|-  style="background:#FFBBBB"
| 2004-00-00 || Loss ||align=left| Giorgio Petrosyan ||  ||  || Decision || 5 || 3:00
|-
|-  style="background:#FFBBBB"
| 2003-07-26 || Loss ||align=left| Andrea Ronchi || Best of the Best 2 || Jesolo, Italy || Decision || 5 ||
|-
|-  bgcolor="#c5d2ea"
| 2003-07-13 || Draw ||align=left| Mohamed El Idrissi || Vetllada en Hospitalet || Barcelona, Spain || Decision || 5 || 2:00
|-
|-
| colspan=9 | Legend:    

|-
|-
|-  style="background:#FFBBBB"
| 2004-11-09 || Loss ||align=left| Tommi Pitkälä || World Muaythai Championships 2004, Semi Final || Bangkok, Thailand || decision || 2 ||
|-
! style="background:white" colspan=8 | 
|-
|-  style="background:#CCFFCC"
| 2004-11-07 || Win ||align=left| Ondasyn Muzapparov || World Muaythai Championships 2004, 2nd Round || Bangkok, Thailand || TKO (Lowkick) || 2 ||
|-
|-  style="background:#CCFFCC"
| 2004-11-05 || Win ||align=left| Chorder || World Muaythai Championships 2004, 1st Round || Bangkok, Thailand || TKO (Referee Stoppage) || 2 ||
|-
|-  style="background:#CCFFCC"
| 2004-04-24 || Win ||align=left| Tarik Benshimed || French Muay Thai Championship 2004 Class B, Final || Paris, France || Decision || 5 ||
|-
! style="background:white" colspan=8 | 
|-
|-  style="background:#CCFFCC"
| 2004-01-17 || Win ||align=left| Tommy Vatsana || French Championship 2004 Class B, Quarter Final || Paris, France ||  ||  ||
|-
|-

See also 
List of male kickboxers

References

External links
Fabio Pinca profile 

1984 births
Living people
French male kickboxers
French male mixed martial artists
Mixed martial artists utilizing Muay Thai
Lightweight kickboxers
French Muay Thai practitioners
French people of Italian descent
Kunlun Fight kickboxers
ONE Championship kickboxers
Glory kickboxers